Dihydrotanshinone I (DI) is a naturally occurring compound extracted from Salvia miltiorrhiza Bunge, also known as Chinese sage, red sage root, and the Chinese herbal Dan Shen. It belongs to a class of lipophilic abietane diterpenoids and has been reported to have cytotoxicity to a variety of tumor cells, as well as antiviral effects in vitro. Since they were first discovered, over 40 related compounds and over 50 hydrophilic compounds have been isolated from Dan Shen.

References

Diketones